The Banta House is a house located in Houston, Texas listed on the National Register of Historic Places. The house is a unique variation of the Bungaloid influence within the historic Houston Heights district, with an unusual brick-over-concrete with double gallery supported by tapering square portico.

See also
 National Register of Historic Places listings in Harris County, Texas

References

National Register of Historic Places in Houston
Houses on the National Register of Historic Places in Texas
1918 establishments in Texas
Houses completed in 1918
Bungalow architecture in Texas
Houses in Houston